Cantharis fusca is a species of soldier beetle.

Except for parts of the head and thorax, which are red or orange, this species is completely black. The body is flat and long, with a weak exoskeleton. These beetles have long feathery antennae, and comparatively long legs.

This species is common in large parts of Europe, and lives in bushes, edges of forests, and meadows. They hunt for small insects.

The larvae have black hairs, and also eat small insects. They are very cold-resistant, and can be seen crawling on the snow in winter.

References

Cantharidae
Beetles of Europe
Beetles described in 1758
Articles containing video clips
Taxa named by Carl Linnaeus